The Rizhao–Lankao high-speed railway is a high-speed railway in Shandong and Henan, China.

History

Description
The total length of the route from Rizhao to Lankao will be .

The railway heads inland to Qufu East on the Beijing–Shanghai high-speed railway thereby providing high-speed connections to a wide variety of destinations.

Services
In November 2019, there were around ten trains per day in each direction along the line, the fastest time between the terminals is now 1 hour 14 minutes (trains G5589 and G5570) the slowest direct train on the line takes 1 hour and 53 minutes and stops at every station (train G5578). There are other trains that go the long way around between the stations, for example train G5528 goes from Linyi North to Rizhao West via Qufu, Jinan, Weifang and Qingdao taking 4 hours 35 minutes.

Whilst quite a few of the direct trains travel just between Rizhao and Qufu, there are numerous other direct trains which include this section of line, destinations available by direct trains include Qingdao, Zibo, Weihai, Yantai, Jinan and Tai'an.

Stations

 (via branch)

References

Railway lines opened in 2019
High-speed railway lines in China
Rail transport in Shandong